The men's javelin throw event at the 1982 Commonwealth Games was held on 9 October at the QE II Stadium in Brisbane, Australia. It was the last time that the old model javelin was used at the Games.

Results

References

Results (The Sydney Morning Herald)
Results (The Canberra Times)
Australian results 

Athletics at the 1982 Commonwealth Games
1982